The 3rd Mountain Division was a formation of the German Wehrmacht during World War II. It was created from the Austrian Army's 5th and 7th Divisions following the Anschluss in 1938.

History
The division took part in the Invasion of Poland 1939 as part of Army Group South, but was transferred to garrison the West Wall before the end of the campaign. In 1940 it joined the invasion of Norway, most famously sending its 139th Mountain Regiment under General Eduard Dietl to seize the ice-free Arctic port of Narvik. The Allies briefly managed to take the town back, but abandoned it to the Germans after the invasion of France.

In 1941 the division moved into Lapland to participate in Operation Silberfuchs, the attack on the Soviet Arctic as part of Operation Barbarossa, but failed to capture Murmansk. The division was withdrawn to Germany for rehabilitation at the end of the year, but left its 139th Mountain Infantry Regiment behind to operate independently. After rehabilitation, the division returned to Norway in 1942, where it served as a reserve. It was then transferred to the Eastern Front, where it served as a reserve for Army Group North near Leningrad. In November 1942 it was committed to the front where the Soviets had surrounded Velikiye Luki, and then transferred to the far south to help in the attempt to relieve Stalingrad. It fought the remainder of the war in the south, retreating with the front lines through the Ukraine, Hungary, Slovakia, and finally surrendering to the Soviets in Silesia at the end of the war.

Commanders
 Generaloberst Eduard Dietl   (1938 – 14 June 1940)
 General der Gebirgstruppe Julius Ringel   (14 June 1940 – 23 October 1940)
 General der Gebirgstruppe Hans Kreysing   (23 October 1940 – 10 August 1943)
 Generalleutnant Egbert Picker   (10 August 1943 – 26 August 1943)
 General der Infanterie Siegfried Rasp   (26 August 1943 – 10 September 1943)
 Generalleutnant Egbert Picker   (10 September 1943 – 29 September 1943)
 Generalleutnant August Wittmann   (29 September 1943 – 3 July 1944)
 Generalleutnant Paul Klatt   (3 July 1944 – 8 May 1945)

References

3
3
Military units and formations established in 1938
Military units and formations disestablished in 1945